Oshawa is an unincorporated community in Cass County, Minnesota, United States, near Backus.  The community is located near the junction of Cass County Road 41 and State Highway 87 (MN 87).  Oshawa is located within Bull Moose Township and Deerfield Township.  The Badoura State Forest and the Foot Hills State Forest are both nearby.

A post office was established at Oshawa in 1916, and remained in operation until it was discontinued in 1944.

References

Unincorporated communities in Cass County, Minnesota
Unincorporated communities in Minnesota